The 1922–23 season was Manchester City F.C.'s thirty-second season of league football, and ninth consecutive season in the Football League First Division, excluding the four years during the First World War in which no competitive football was played.

The season was the last in which Manchester City would play at their Hyde Road stadium, the ground having been declared too small for the growing ambitions of the club, the move having been hastened by a devastating fire burning down the Main Stand back in November 1920. The following season the club made the transition to their new ground, Maine Road.

Team Kit

Football League First Division

Results summary

Reports

FA Cup

Squad statistics

Squad
Appearances for competitive matches only

Scorers

See also
Manchester City F.C. seasons

References

External links
Extensive Manchester City statistics site

Manchester City F.C. seasons
Manchester City F.C.